2nd Avenue or Second Avenue may refer to:

Places (including transport stations)
 2nd Avenue & Abilene station, a light rail station in Aurora, Colorado, U.S.
 2nd Avenue Lofts, a historic building in the Central Business District, Saskatoon, Saskatchewan, Canada
 Second Avenue Deli, kosher delicatessen in Manhattan, NY, U.S.
 Irving and 2nd Avenue station, a light rail stop in San Francisco, U.S.
 Second Avenue (IND Sixth Avenue Line), a station on the New York City Subway

Roads and transportation 
 2nd Avenue, an arterial road in Whitehorse, Yukon, Canada
 M15 (New York City bus), a bus route in Manhattan that runs on First and Second Avenue
 Second Avenue, a neighborhood of Albany, New York, U.S.
 Second Avenue (IND Sixth Avenue Line), a New York City Subway station
 Second Avenue (Brooklyn), a street in Brooklyn, U.S.
 Second Avenue (Manhattan), a street in New York, U.S.
 Second Avenue (Nashville, Tennessee), site of a Christmas Day 2020 explosion
 Second Avenue (Pittsburgh), a street in Pittsburgh, PA, U.S.
 Second Avenue Subway, or IND Second Avenue Line, a line in the New York City Subway

Defunct roads and transportation 
 IRT Second Avenue Line, or Second Avenue El, a former elevated railway
 Second Avenue Railroad, a former street railway company

Arts, entertainment, and media 
2nd Avenue (album), by No Justice, 2010
 Second Avenue (album), by Lisa Moscatiello, 2000
 "Second Avenue" (song), a 1974 song written by Tim Moore and recorded by Art Garfunkel
 2nd Avenue (TV channel), a defunct television network in the Philippines
 On Second Avenue, a Yiddish American musical theatre production

See also

2nd Street (disambiguation)